Algheden is the name of two towns in the western Gash-Barka region of Eritrea:

Algheden, Dghe, Dghe District
Algheden, Forto, Forto District